Goettel Escarpment is a prominent escarpment buttressing the Dyer Plateau located  north of Orion Massif and near the head of Chapman Glacier in Palmer Land. 

It was named by the Advisory Committee on Antarctic Names for Captain Frederick A. Goettel, U.S. Coast Guard, Commanding Officer of USCGC Westwind (WAGB-281), in support of construction of the new Palmer Station, during Operation Deep Freeze, 1967.

References

Escarpments of Antarctica
Landforms of Palmer Land